Marino Dusić is a Croatian astronomer and a discoverer of minor planets.

He studied Computer science at the University of Ljubljana in Slovenia. Along with astronomer Korado Korlević, he discovered two asteroids, 11706 Rijeka and 12512 Split, at the Višnjan Observatory, Croatia, in 1998.

References

External links 
 Marino Dusić at the Višnjan Observatory, official website

20th-century astronomers
20th-century Croatian people
Croatian astronomers
Discoverers of asteroids
Living people
University of Ljubljana alumni
Year of birth missing (living people)